Samuel Blair may refer to:

 Samuel Blair (pastor) (1712–1751), leader of the Presbyterian New Light religious movement
 Samuel Blair (chaplain) (1741–1818), second Chaplain of the United States House of Representatives
 Samuel Steel Blair (1821–1890), Republican United States Representative from Pennsylvania